Cwen may be:

 an Old English term associated with Kvenland, an area in Scandinavia
 Kven Sea
 Kven people
 Cwen language or Kven language
an Old English word for "queen" or "woman"
 Society of Cwens, a former American honorary society

See also 

 
 
 Etymology of Kven
 Kven (disambiguation)
 Cven (disambiguation)